TV Quick was a British weekly television listing magazine published by H Bauer Publishing, the UK subsidiary of family-run German company Bauer Media Group. It featured weekly television listings running from Saturday to Friday, and began publication on 30 March 1991 following deregulation of the UK listing magazine market.

The magazine had its own annual awards ceremony, the TV Quick Awards, awarded on the basis of a public vote by readers of TV Quick and its sister publication TV Choice. The awards were renamed the TV Choice Awards following the title's closure.

The title's demise followed a 27% year-on-year fall in circulation between 2008 and 2009 according to the Audit Bureau of Circulations. In May 2010 Bauer announced that it had commenced a 30-day consultation period with its staff about the magazine's future, and the magazine ceased publication shortly after. It was suggested that the fall in sales was due to the magazine being caught in a no-mans-land between premium titles such as Radio Times and TV Times and budget titles like TV Choice and What's on TV.

References

1991 establishments in the United Kingdom
2010 disestablishments in the United Kingdom
Bauer Group (UK)
Defunct magazines published in the United Kingdom
Listings magazines
Magazines established in 1991
Magazines disestablished in 2010
Television magazines published in the United Kingdom
Weekly magazines published in the United Kingdom